Hunli is a town and head office of Hunli-Desali Tehsil of Lower Dibang Valley district in the north-eastern state of Arunachal Pradesh, India.

Facilities

It is a Tehsil headquarter with a school.

Location 
It is located on the  proposed Mago-Thingbu to Vijaynagar Arunachal Pradesh Frontier Highway along the McMahon Line,  alignment map of which can be seen here and here.

Media
Hunli has an All India Radio Relay station known as Akashvani Hunli. It broadcasts on FM frequencies.

See also

 North-East Frontier Agency
 List of people from Arunachal Pradesh
 Religion in Arunachal Pradesh
 Cuisine of Arunachal Pradesh
 List of institutions of higher education in Arunachal Pradesh

References 

Villages in Lower Dibang Valley district